Diego Jésus Castillo Granados (born July 5, 1991) is a Panamanian swimmer. At the 2012 Summer Olympics, he competed in the Men's 200 metre butterfly, finishing in 35th place overall in the heats, failing to qualify for the semifinals.

References

Panamanian male swimmers
1991 births
Living people
Olympic swimmers of Panama
Swimmers at the 2012 Summer Olympics
Male butterfly swimmers
Swimmers at the 2007 Pan American Games
Swimmers at the 2011 Pan American Games
Pan American Games competitors for Panama
20th-century Panamanian people
21st-century Panamanian people